Comb Ridge is a linear north to south-trending monocline nearly 80 miles long in Southeastern Utah and Northeastern Arizona. Its northern end merges with the Abajo Mountains some eleven miles west of Blanding.

It was designated a National Natural Landmark in 1976 as the only North American location of tritylodont fossils. Parts of the ridge in Utah are protected as part of the Bears Ears National Monument.

Geology
The geologic formations involved in the east dipping strata of the fold include the Jurassic aged Navajo Sandstone, Kayenta Formation, Wingate Sandstone, Chinle Formation, Triassic Moenkopi Formation and Permian Organ Rock Formation. The structure is the surface expression of a deep fault along the east margin of the Monument Uplift.

History
Traces of the Ancestral Puebloan culture can be found along the southern part of the ridge where it follows Chinle Wash. The Macomb and Hayden expeditions in 1869 and 1874–1876, respectively, were the first to publish maps and descriptions of this feature. The ridge and adjacent Butler Wash were given their current names in 1884, by P. Holmann.

Numerous cliff dwellings are found along the ridge.

See also 
 Posey War
 Trail of the Ancients
 Anasazi State Park Museum
 Pueblo III Era

References

External links

 Comb Ridge National Park Service

Cliff dwellings
National Natural Landmarks in Arizona
Landforms of Apache County, Arizona
Landforms of Navajo County, Arizona
Landforms of San Juan County, Utah
Rock formations of Arizona
Rock formations of Utah
Bears Ears National Monument